Opatówek may refer to:
 Opatówek, a village in Poland
Opatówek, West Pomeranian Voivodeship (north-west Poland)
 Commune Opatówek, of which Opatówek is the largest village